Jinhu Lu is an electrical engineer at the Chinese Academy of Sciences in Beijing. Lu was named a Fellow of the Institute of Electrical and Electronics Engineers (IEEE) in 2013 for his contributions to complex networks and nonlinear circuits and systems.

Lu received a PhD in applied math from the Chinese Academy of Sciences in 2002.

References

Fellow Members of the IEEE
Living people
Chinese engineers
Year of birth missing (living people)
Place of birth missing (living people)